Smash Cut is a 2009 Canadian slasher film directed and edited by Lee Demarbre, and produced by Robert Menzies. Starring David Hess, Sasha Grey, Michael Berryman, Ray Sager and Herschell Gordon Lewis, the plot follows a struggling filmmaker who finds that practical effects are much easier to come by.

Plot
Television reporter April Carson turns to the services of private investigator Isaac Beaumonde to find her missing sister, a stripper known as Gigi Spot. Carson assumes a role in a horror movie in the process, eventually learning that the director, Able Whitman, is not only the culprit, but that he has rendered her sister's body into props.

Whitman requires more "props" for his film, meaning more body parts, which in turn requires a killing spree. Meanwhile, Beaumonde pursues an increasingly deadly and grisly case.

Cast
 David Hess as Able Whitman
 Sasha Grey as April Carson
 Michael Berryman as Philip Farmsworth Jr.
 Ray Sager as Reverend Ezekial Boone
 Herschell Gordon Lewis as Fred Sandy
 Jesse Buck as Isaac Beaumonde
 Jennilee Murray as Georgina Carson / Gigi Spot
 Michael Dubue	as Alan Dackman
 Barry Blake as Armand Parys
 Peter Michael Dillon as Oswald "Ozzie" Kohlberg
 Rusty Nails as Kohlberg / Oswald

Production
Director Lee Demarbre cast cult horror actors David Hess (The Last House on the Left), Michael Berryman (The Hills Have Eyes) and Ray Sager (The Wizard of Gore). Herschell Gordon Lewis, considered the inventor of the splatter film genre, appears in the film's opening, advising the audience to "watch if you must". The film was the first non-pornographic role for adult film performer Sasha Grey.

Investors were concerned that Smash Cut would be hindered by the proposed Income Tax Amendments Act, 2006 law (Bill C-10) that could restrict tax benefits for films whose content the federal government deemed objectionable. These concerns were particularly prompted by the casting of Grey, but Demarbre retorted, "I don't want to make a porn movie. I want to make a movie with Sasha Grey. I want to take her right out of the porn genre."

Principal photography took place from 9 May to 4 June 2008 in Ottawa, Ontario, at area locations including the Mayfair Theatre and Rockland.

Release

Smash Cut premiered at the Fantasia International Film Festival in Montreal on 18 July 2009. It was followed up on 29 August at the London FrightFest Film Festival in the United Kingdom. The film was released direct-to-DVD.

Critical reception
Critic Todd Brown wrote in Screen Anarchy that the film was "a campy dose of low budget splatter" and "[i]f you aren't inclined towards early splatter pics, you're going to be bored. There's really no way to take it seriously outside the context of its tradition."
Writing for Home Theater Info, critic Douglas MacLean wrote that the film "occupies the nadir of the film industry," consisting of "ultra cheap effects and one take shots that provide no time for artistry or nuance."

References

External links
 
 

2009 films
2000s slasher films
English-language Canadian films
Films shot in Ottawa
Canadian slasher films
2009 horror films
Shriek Show
2000s English-language films
Films directed by Lee Demarbre
2000s Canadian films